Savosavo is an endangered language spoken on Savo, a small volcanic island north of Guadalcanal in the Solomon Islands. Savosavo is one of the Central Solomon languages, which are Papuan languages, unlike most of the languages in the vicinity, which are members of the Oceanic branch of the Austronesian language family. There are close to 3,000 speakers of Savosavo, and it is the easternmost Papuan language in the Pacific. Savosavo is the main language of nine of the twelve districts in the Solomon Islands. The closest Papuan language to Savosavo is the Central Solomon Lavukaleve, spoken in the Russell Islands to the west. Other neighbor languages are Bughotu, Ghari, and Lengo, Bughotu is to the north, while Ghari and Lengo are to the south, and are spoken on Guadalcanal.

Speakers 
Speakers on Savo are known as agriculturalists. Vegetables and fruit are the main source of food while fish, chicken, and rice round out the overall diet. Rice is also an important commodity, but it has to be bought and is not grown on Savo. A large number of people on Savo are without regularly paid work. To earn income, they sell commodities such as cocoa beans or garden produce at local markets or in the capital Honiara.

Clan lineages are important to the people of Savo, as it makes up their social organization. A clan leader is known as 'chief' and there is one for each of the six clans on Savo. These leaders are all part of the Savo Ghizi Kato House of Chiefs and are important on the local levels. The six clans are Ghaubata, Kakau, Lakuili, Kiki, Tanakidi, and Zoqo. Land in Savo is owned by the clans and not the individuals. Each member of the clan has the rights to a portion of land, but it must be connected to his/her mother's ancestors.

The Central Province is known to have the lowest literacy rates of the Solomon Islands. As a result, literacy of languages such as Savosavo are small. The language is rarely used in writing, since most people only go through a few years of schooling. Savosavo is used in minor situations such as letters, notes, and notices to the public.

Phonology 
Savosavo has five vowels and 17 consonants.

Vowels have no length contrast, and the vowels /e/, /i/, /o/, and /u/ vary freely between different allophones.

Consonants 
In total there are four places and six manners of articulation for consonants.

There are three voiceless stops: /p/, /t/, and /k/ and four voiced stops: /b/, /d/, /ɟ/ and /g/.

Vowels 
The vowels have no length contrast, and the vowels /e/, /i/, /o/ and /u/ vary freely between different allophones. 

Sequences of identical vowels are not allowed in Savosavo. All other sequences are allowed. 

 a and e – ae (to be married)
 e and a – onea (to listen)
 i and o – pio (man)
 o and e – dodoe (4th gen relative)
 u and i – koi (eight)

Orthography 
The Savosavo language has 5 vowels (a, e, i, o, u) and 17 consonants (b, d, g, gh, j, k, l, m, n, gn, ng, p, r, s, t, v, z). This is the Anglican orthography. In the Catholic orthography, G is written Q, and Gh is written G. In other orthographies, Gn is written Ñ, and Ng is written N̄.

Grammar

Verbs 
Verbs usually mark tense, aspect and mood. They are by the far the largest word class in Savosavo, making up 47% of the overall word class. There are three types of verbs in Savosavo.

Transitive verbs 
Transitive verb stems have object marking. These verbs usually agree with their object in person (number) and in the third person singular (gender) using suffixes, prefixes, and stem modification. 

 Stems taking prefixes only:
 l-agha 'to marry'
 l-aka 'to help '
 l-au 'to take'
 l-eghe 'to see'
 l-ogha 'to weave'
 l-ogo 'to collect'

 Stems taking both prefixes and suffixes:
 l-ave-li 'to kill'
 l-ogho-li 'to fill'
 l-ova-li 'to bite'
 l-ogha-li 'to own'
 l-ame-li 'to give'
 l-esgangi-li 'to spoil'
 Stems showing stem modification
 sala 'to follow'
 solo 'to throw'
 pala 'to make'
 bola 'to shoot'
 Stems taking suffixes only:
 aghi-li 'to pull'
 jurake-li 'to shatter'
 rami-li 'to shoot'

Intransitive verbs 
Intransitive verb stems usually are without object marking. The suffix -vi can only be used on four intransitive verbs. When the suffix is added, there also has to be an object marking suffix.

 sogha (to jump) + -vi = sogha-vi-li
 raghe (to run) + -vi = raghe-vi li
 sara (to reach) + -vi = sara-vi-li 
 tete (to balance) + -vi = tete-vi-li

There are also transitive verbs that cannot be transitivized. Examples are ngori 'to snore', bo 'to go', and vige 'to dry'.

Ambitransitive verbs 
Ambitransitive verb stems can occur with or without object marking. These verbs use suffixes to mark their object. 

 ghavi 'to paddle' = ghavi-li 'to paddle a canoe'
 ale 'to enter' = ale-li 'to enter something'
 sali 'to wash away' = sali-li 'to wash something away'
 kasanga 'to be angry' = kasanga-li 'to be angry about'

Nouns 
Nouns are the second largest word class in Savosavo, making up around 40% of the overall word class. Nouns can be derived from verbs by the suffix -ghu. Another way to differentiate nouns from verbs in the concept of reduplication. This occurs when nouns can be duplicated to insinuate a verb.

 elu 'Ngali nut' = élu~elu 'to gather Ngali nuts'
 kumara 'sweet potato' = kuma~kumara 'to harvest sweet potatoes'
 kosu 'bird' = kosu~kosu 'to hunt for birds'
 itoro 'walking stick' = ito~itoro 'to walk with a walking stick'

Many of the language names were actually made by duplicating the place where the language was spoken. This is how Savo~savo came to be. 

Overall, nouns are required to be verbalized using the suffix -sa in order to function as the head of the verb phrase:

 Lo mavutu=na ka molumolu-sa-zu (The place was already an island)

Number System 
Savosavo's number system is based on the decimal counting system. What is interesting about this counting system is that there are two different words for 'one'. These words are ela and pade. Ela is usually used either in counting or to denote the numeral 'first'. As a modifier it means 'some'.

Pade as a modifier is usually shortened to pa. 

Besides numerals, there are also other quantifiers:

 alea 'how many, however many'
 elave 'some more'
 padenge 'only one'
 pameve/pame 'one more'
 daivata 'plenty'
 du(lo) 'all'
 palea/paleva 'few'

Notes

References

External links 
 Materials on Savosavo are included in the open access Arthur Capell collections (AC1 and AC2) held by Paradisec.
 Savosavo DoReCo corpus compiled by Claudia Wegener. Audio recordings of narrative texts with transcriptions time-aligned at the phone level, translations, and time-aligned morphological annotations.

Languages of the Solomon Islands
Central Solomon languages
Definitely endangered languages